The Duluth Fire Department provides fire protection and emergency medical services to the City of Duluth, Minnesota.

The city commissioned an external analysis of the Department in 2012.  According to the report the department employed 141 staff members, who at the time staffed 9 fire stations.

In May 2019 the department acquired the fireboat Marine 19, through a FEMA port security grant.

Stations and apparatus 
The department operates from 8 stations located throughout the city.

References

Fire departments in Minnesota